Epidesma ursula is a moth of the subfamily Arctiinae. It was described by Caspar Stoll in 1781. It is found in Suriname and the Amazon region.

References

Epidesma
Moths described in 1782